The third competition weekend of the 2019–20 ISU Speed Skating World Cup was held at the Alau Ice Palace in Nur-Sultan, Kazakhstan, from Friday, 6 December, until Sunday, 8 December 2019.

Medal summary

Men's events

Women's events

References

3
ISU World Cup, 2019-20, 3
2019 in Kazakhstani sport
ISU